Peter Boro was a performer of Croatian music, best known for his playing of the gusle and misnice. In the 1930s and 1940s, he brought Croatian music to an American audience, and is featured on the Library of Congress's California Gold: Northern California Folk Music from the Thirties Collection.

External links
 Gusle solo from California Gold: Northern California Folk Music from the Thirties Collection, performed on December 20, 1939 in Fresno, California
 Picture of Peter Boro; one of several

Croatian musicians
Living people
Year of birth missing (living people)